Revaz Arveladze (born 15 September 1969) is a Georgian former professional footballer who played as a midfielder for various sides in Georgia, Germany and Belgium.

Club career
Born in Tbilisi, Arveladze began his senior career with Georgian club FC Dinamo Tbilisi. He then played abroad in Germany, and Belgium, before returning to Georgia in 1998.

International career
Arveladze won 11 caps for the Georgia national team.

Post-playing career
Arveladze works as the Secretary General of the Football Federation of Georgia.

Personal life
He is the elder brother of fellow Georgian internationals Archil and Shota Arveladze. His youngest son, Vato is also professionally engaged in football.

Career statistics

References

External links
 

1969 births
Living people
Soviet footballers
Footballers from Georgia (country)
Association football midfielders
Georgia (country) international footballers
FC Dinamo Tbilisi players
1. FC Köln players
Rot-Weiß Oberhausen players
Tennis Borussia Berlin players
FC 08 Homburg players
K.V. Mechelen players
Bundesliga players
2. Bundesliga players
Expatriate footballers from Georgia (country)
Expatriate sportspeople from Georgia (country) in Germany
Expatriate footballers in Germany
Expatriate sportspeople from Georgia (country) in Belgium
Expatriate footballers in Belgium
Football managers from Georgia (country)
FC Dinamo Tbilisi managers
Footballers from Tbilisi